

2018 Orienteering World Cup
 May 5 – 13: World Cup Round 1 in 
 Sprint winners:  Daniel Hubmann (m) /  Tove Alexandersson (f)
 Middle winners:  Matthias Kyburz (m) /  Marika Teini (f)
 Long winners:  Olav Lundanes (m) /  Tove Alexandersson (f)
 August 4 – 11: World Cup Round 2 in 
 Sprint winners:  Daniel Hubmann (m) /  Maja Alm (f)
 Middle winners:  Eskil Kinneberg (m) /  Natalia Gemperle (f)
 Long winners:  Olav Lundanes (m) /  Tove Alexandersson (f)
 August 31 – September 2: World Cup Round 3 in 
 Long winners:  Gustav Bergman (m) /  Tove Alexandersson (f)
 Middle winners:  William Lind (m) /  Tove Alexandersson (f)
 October 4 – 7: World Cup Round 4 in 
 Knockout Sprint winners:  Vojtěch Král (m) /  Judith Wyder (f)
 Middle winners:  Milos Nykodym (m) /  Karolin Ohlsson (f)
 Long winners:  Jonas Leandersson (m) /  Tove Alexandersson (f)

2018 MTB Orienteering World Cup
 June 27 – July 1: World Cup Round 1 in  
 August 4 – 12: World Cup Round 2 in  
 September 20 – 23: World Cup Round 3 in

2017–18 World Cup in Ski Orienteering
 November 28 – December 4, 2017: Ski Orienteering World Cup Round 1 in 
 Sprint winners:  Andrey Lamov (m) /  Salla Koskela (f)
 Middle winners:  Andrey Lamov (m) /  Tove Alexandersson (f)
 Long winners:  Andrey Lamov (m) /  Tove Alexandersson (f)
 February 3 – 8: Ski Orienteering World Cup Round 2 in 
 Sprint winners:  Eduard Khrennikov (m) /  Tove Alexandersson (f)
 Middle winners:  Andrey Lamov (m) /  Tove Alexandersson (f)
 Long winners:  Erik Rost (m) /  Maria Kechkina (f)
 March 4 – 12: Ski Orienteering World Cup Round 3 in 
 Sprint winners:  Andrey Lamov (m) /  Tove Alexandersson (f)
 Middle winners:  Erik Rost /  Tove Alexandersson (f)
 Long winners:  Erik Rost (m) /  Salla Koskela (f)
 Mixed sprint relay winners:  (Erik Rost & Tove Alexandersson)

Continental & International Orienteering events
 February 3 – 8: European Ski Orienteering Championships in 
 Long winners:  Erik Rost (m) /  Maria Kechkina (f)
 Middle winners:  Andrey Lamov (m) /  Tove Alexandersson (f)
 Sprint winners:  Eduard Khrennikov (m) /  Tove Alexandersson (f)
 Mixed sprint relay winners:  1 (Tove Alexandersson & Erik Rost) 
 Relay winners:  1 (Jørgen Madslien, Øyvind Watterdal, Lars Moholdt)
 February 4 – 8: European Youth Ski Orienteering Championships in 
 Sprint U17 winners:  Artemiy Dorma (m) /  Zoya Chernykh (f)
 Middle U17 winners:  Akseli Virtanen (m) /  Alina Niggli (f)
 Long U17 winners:  Matias Maijala (m) /  Olesia Riazanova (f)
 Relay winners:  (Samuli Peltola, Akseli Virtanen, Matias Maijala)
 February 4 – 8: Junior World Ski Orienteering Championships in 
 Sprint U20 winners:  Igor Linkevich (m) /  Liisa Nenonen (f)
 Middle U20 winners:  Jørgen Baklid (m) /  Marina Vyatkina (f)
 Long U20 winners:  Jørgen Baklid (m) /  Ekaterina Stepanova (f)
 Relay winners:  1 (Sergey Mizonov, Nicolai Vlasov, Igor Linkevich)
 February 21 – 25: 2018 World University Ski Orienteering Championship in  Tartu
 Sprint winners:  Sergey Gorlanov (m) /  Anna Ulvensøen (f)
 Pursuit winners:  Jørgen Haugen Madslien (m) /  Anna Ulvensøen (f)
 Middle distance winners:  Sergey Gorlanov (m) /  Anna Ulvensøen (f)
 Sprint Relay winners:  1 (Anna Ulvensøen & Jørgen Haugen Madslien)
 March 6 – 10: World Masters Ski Orienteering Championships 2018 in 
 For Middle 1 Results here.
 For Middle 2 Results here.
 For Long Results here.
 April 28 – May 1: European Trail Orienteering Championships 2018 in 
 PreO winner:  Antti Rusanen
 PreO Para winner:  Pavel Shmatov
 TempO winner:  Pinja Mäkinen
 Relay winners:  1 (Pinja Mäkinen, Juha Hiirsalmi, Antti Rusanen)
 Relay Para winners:  1 (Hanka Doležalová, Pavel Dudík, Jana Kostová)
 May 6 – 13: 2018 European Orienteering Championships in  Cadempino
 Sprint winners:  Daniel Hubmann (m) /  Tove Alexandersson (f)
 Middle winners:  Matthias Kyburz (m) /  Marika Teini (f)
 Long winners:  Olav Lundanes (m) /  Tove Alexandersson (f)
 Sprint Relay winners:  (Judith Wyder, Florian Howald, Daniel Hubmann, Elena Roos)
 Relay winners:  1 (Eskil Kinneberg, Magne Dæhli, Olav Lundanes)
 May 26: Baltic Orienteering Championships in 
 Winners:  Artūrs Pauliņš (m) /  Sandra Grosberga (f)
 June 8 & 9: MTB Baltic Orienteering Championships 2018 in 
 Sprint Elite winners:  Grigory Medvedev (m) /  Svetlana Poverina (f)
 Middle Elite winners:  Jonas Maišelis (m) /  Olga Shipilova-Vinogradova (f)
 June 28 – July 1: European Youth Orienteering Championships 2018 in 
 July 6 – 13: World Masters Orienteering Championships 2018 in 
 July 8 – 15: Junior World Orienteering Championships in 
 July 17 – 21: 2018 World University Orienteering Championship in  Kuortane
 June 27 – July 1: European Junior MTB Orienteering Championships in 
 Sprint winners:  Thomas Steinthal (m) /  Marina Oparina (f)
 Long winners:  Thomas Steinthal (m) /  Lou Garcin (f)
 Middle winners:  Thomas Steinthal (m) /  Uliana Sukholovskaya (f)
 Relay winners:  (Tomi Nykanen, Juha Lilja, Teemu Kaksonen) (m) /  (Veronika Grycova, Rozalie Kucharova, Vilma Kralova)
 June 27 – July 1: European MTB Orienteering Championships in 
 Long winners:  Vojtech Ludvik (m) /  Martina Tichovska (f)
 Middle winners:  Kryštof Bogar (m) /  Olga Shipilova Vinogradova (f)
 Mixed Relay winners:  1 (Martina Tichovska, Vojtech Ludvik, Kryštof Bogar)
 June 27 – July 1: World Masters MTB Orienteering Championships 2018 in 
 For Mass Start Results here.
 For Sprint Results here.
 For Long Results here.
 For Middle Results here.
 August 4 – 11: 2018 World Orienteering Championships in 
 Long winners:  Olav Lundanes (m) /  Tove Alexandersson (f)
 Middle winners:  Eskil Kinneberg (m) /  Natalia Gemperle (f)
 Sprint winners:  Daniel Hubmann (m) /  Maja Alm (f)
 Relay winners:  (Gaute Hallan Steiwer, Eskil Kinneberg, Magne Dæhli) (m) /  (Elena Roos, Julia Jakob, Judith Wyder)
 Sprint Relay winners:  (Tove Alexandersson, Emil Svensk, Jonas Leandersson, Karolin Ohlsson)
 August 4 – 11: World Trail Orienteering Championships 2018 in 
 TempO winner:  Petteri Hakala 
 PreO winner:  Jan Furucz
 Relay winners:  (Lars Jakob Waaler, Geir Myhr Oien, Sondre Ruud Braten)
 August 5 – 12: European Youth MTB Orienteering Championships in 
 Middle winners:  Kylian Wymer (m) /  Kaarina Nurminen (f)
 Long winners:  Richard Wohanka (m) /  Kaarina Nurminen (f)
 Sprint winners:  Kylian Wymer (m) /  Alena Aksenova (f)
 Relay winners:  1 (Kylian Wymer, Albin Demaret-Joly, Jason Bedry) (m) /  1 (Cristina Vaganova, Anastasiia Ruzanova, Alena Aksenova) (f)
 August 5 – 12: World MTB Orienteering Championships in 
 Long winners:  Kryštof Bogar (m) /  Martina Tichovská (f)
 Sprint winners:  Anton Foliforov (m) /  Henna Saarinen (f)
 Mass Start winners:  Jussi Laurila (m) /  Camilla Søgaard (f)
 Middle winners:  Simon Braendli (m) /  Olga Shipilova Vinogradova (f)
 Relay winners:  1 Anton Foliforov, Ruslan Gritsan, Grigory Medvedev) (m) /  1 (Katerina Novakova, Veronika Kubinova, Martina Tichovská) (f)
 August 5 – 12: Junior World MTB Orienteering Championship in 
 Long winners:  Jan Hasek (m) /  Constance Devillers (f)
 Sprint winners:  Thomas Steinthal (m) /  Vilma Králová (f)
 Mass Start winners:  Jan Hasek (m) /  Uliana Sukholovskaya (f)
 Middle winners:  Adrian Jaeggi (m) /  Vilma Králová (f)
 Relay winners:  1 (Richard Wohanka, Matyáš Ludvík, Jan Hasek) (m) /  1 (Veronika Grycová, Alexandra Svobodová, Vilma Králová)
 August 18 – 21: North American Orienteering Championships in 
 Long winners:  Timo Sild (m) /  Alison Crocker (f)
 Middle winners:  Timo Sild (m) /  Alison Crocker (f)
 Sprint winners:  Timo Sild (m) /  Tori Borish (f)
 August 23 – 25: South East European Championships in 
 Long winners:  Tim Robertson (m) /  Kristina Ivanova (f)
 Middle winners:  Jannis Bonek (m) /  Galina Rîbediuc (f)
 Sprint winners:  Tim Robertson (m) /  Laura Robertson (f)
 October 13: Kinmen Orienteering Championships & WRE 2018 in 
 Elite winners:  Tsz Wai Yu (m) /  Cho Yu Lam (f)
 November 5 – 11: South American Orienteering Championships & South American Youth Orienteering Championships in 
 December 23 – 26: Asian Orienteering Championships in

References

External links
 International Orienteering Federation Website

Orienteering
Outdoor locating games